The KBC Augusta is a professional golf tournament that is held in Fukuoka Prefecture, Japan. The title sponsor is the Kyushu Asahi Broadcasting and it is held in August. Since its foundation in 1973, it has been an event on the Japan Golf Tour.

Since 1992, the KBC Augusta has been played at Keya Golf Club near Itoshima. Before then it was played at Fukuoka Country Club (Wajiro Course) near Fukuoka until 1982 and then at Kyushu Shima Country Club near Itoshima between 1983 and 1991. The tournament scoring records are 262 (aggregate) and −26 (to par) set by Kazuki Higa in 2019.

The 2021 purse was ¥100,000,000, with ¥20,000,000 going to the winner.

Tournament hosts

Winners

Notes

References

External links
Coverage on the Japan Golf Tour's official site
Tournament's site 

Golf tournaments in Japan
Japan Golf Tour events
Sport in Fukuoka Prefecture
Recurring sporting events established in 1973
1973 establishments in Japan